Jedi Quest is an eleven-book young-reader series written by Jude Watson about Obi-Wan Kenobi and his apprentice Anakin Skywalker. It is set in the fictional Star Wars universe between Episode I: The Phantom Menace and Episode II: Attack of the Clones (32–22 BBY). The series was published from 2001 to 2004.

Summaries
The introductory novel, Path to Truth, is unnumbered, meaning the last ten books of the eleven-book series are numbered 1–10.

Path to Truth
Anakin has undergone over three years of preparatory training since the events of The Phantom Menace. Path to Truth begins with Anakin Skywalker and Obi-Wan Kenobi climbing atop of a cliff. Anakin has to find his crystals for his lightsaber. After he completes this task, Skywalker and Kenobi are summoned to complete a mission which leads to the return of friends and old enemies.

Ryder Windham wrote a four-issue comic book adaptation, published by Dark Horse Comics in 2001. This is collected in Star Wars Omnibus: Menace Revealed (2009).

The Way of the Apprentice
In The Way of the Apprentice, four Master-Padawan teams (Anakin and Obi-Wan, Darra Thel-Tanis and Soara Antana, Tru Veld and Ry-Gaul, Ferus Olin and Siri Tachi) must travel to Radnor, where several cities are carrying a deadly virus, and sort out the problem. The mission forces the Masters and Padawans to split into two separate groups, enduring dangers within different sectors of Radnor.  Anakin forms a tense rivalry with Ferus Olin and a friendship in Tru Veld. The Jedi uncover a conspiracy and a threat of an invasion. The mission results in bitter-sweet success.

The Trail of the Jedi
In The Trail of the Jedi, Obi-Wan organizes a training exercise for Anakin and himself. They adventure to the beautiful planet of Ragoon 6 only to find that a team of bounty hunters have been hired to capture them by a mysterious man, named Granta Omega, who wants them dead.

The Dangerous Games
In The Dangerous Games, Obi-Wan and Anakin are sent to the planet Euceron to guard the Galactic Games, along with Master-Padawan teams Siri Tachi & Ferus Olin, and Ry-Gaul & Tru Veld. They learn of a plot involving an illegal podrace that has been fixed to go wrong. Anakin must enter the race and face his old rival Sebulba's son.

The Master of Disguise
In The Master of Disguise, Anakin and Obi-Wan, along with Soara Antana and Darra Thel-Tanis, find themselves caught on a hostile planet attempting to save a group of scientists trapped within its war-torn environment. The rescue is a success, but Anakin errors which results in Darra being severely injured and losing her lightsaber. Obi-Wan discovers that Granta Omega, an old enemy that has marked himself and Anakin for death, is behind the attacks against the Jedi. As Soara takes on the excruciating task of training and refining Anakin's skills with a lightsaber, as well as his own self-perception, Obi-Wan investigates the master of disguise. Granta Omega's origins are revealed, and his intentions will send him waging a one man war against the Jedi Order.

The School of Fear
In The School of Fear, the son of a Senator has gone missing. Anakin and Ferus must infiltrate an elite school in order to find out what has happened, while Obi-Wan and Siri monitor from afar. Anakin joins a secret squad and finds out that Ferus has gone missing, but does not reveal so to the Masters, his prideful intentions aiming to complete the mission alone. He finds that the secret squad was formed by the senator's son who is plotting to use Anakin's dead body to cause a scandal. The result of this mission puts Anakin and Obi-Wan further apart than ever.

The Shadow Trap
In The Shadow Trap, when the Jedi are called in to help pacify a chaotic planet, it should be a routine mission. But behind the chaos is Granta Omega in hiding. The routine mission goes horribly wrong and, in a moment that will be shocking to fans, the Jedi Master Yaddle is killed ... with Anakin feeling responsible. It takes the combined power of Yoda, Anakin, and Obi-Wan to fight this battle and overcome the machinations of Granta Omega.

The Moment of Truth
In The Moment of Truth, Masters and apprentices must trust one another, but that is not the case with Anakin and Obi-Wan. A rift is building between them and an old enemy from Obi-Wan's past, the insane galactic scientist Jenna Zan Arbor, seeks to release an experimental drug onto an unsuspecting populace. When the duo are separated during a rescue mission on a dangerous planet, their conflict reaches a new high—and shows signs of things to come.

The Changing of the Guard
In The Changing of the Guard, Obi-Wan, Anakin, Siri, and Ferus must try to capture the mad scientist Jenna Zan Arbor from a planet run by criminals as a refuge for other criminals. To do this, they have to go undercover, disguised as the kind of scum they usually try to catch. Will the means be worth the ends? Or will Anakin learn too much about the lawless side of the galaxy?

The False Peace
In The False Peace, Granta Omega and his ally Jenna Zan Arbor are destroying planets, framing the Jedi as responsible. Obi-Wan must find a way to clear the Order's name and find Omega before it is too late. Anakin grows in his relationship with Chancellor Palpatine, and Omega's plans threaten the safety of the Senate.

The Final Showdown
In The Final Showdown, Granta Omega has been found. Anakin and Ferus's rivalry reaches a boiling point when Anakin discovers that Ferus has been chosen over him to test out a "Knight Acceleration" program. On a mission to finally capture Omega on the ancient Sith homeworld of Korriban, Anakin and Ferus turn the mission into a contest. Unfortunately, their rivalry causes a fellow Padawan to pay the price for their actions. Granta Omega, revealed to be the son of the Dark Jedi Xanatos (the late Qui-Gon Jinn's old apprentice before Obi-Wan), stages his endgame. Obi-Wan, Anakin, Siri, Ferus, Ry-Gaul, Tru, Soara, and Darra must endure the harsh nature of the Dark Side, broken friendships, death, Omega's cunning, and the hidden influence of the Sith.

See also
List of Star Wars books

References

 
Book series introduced in 2001
Star Wars Legends novels
Interquel novels